Darband-e Loran (also Romanized as Darband-e Lorān; also known as Darband) is a village in Rostaq Rural District, in the Central District of Khomeyn County, Markazi Province, Iran. At the 2006 census, its population was 420, in 123 families.

References 

Populated places in Khomeyn County